Euchaetes fusca is a moth of the family Erebidae. It is found from the south-western United States (including California and Arizona) to Costa Rica.

The wingspan is about 34 mm.

References

Moths described in 1910
Phaegopterina